Oxyporus corticola is a plant pathogen affecting peaches, nectarines and apricots.

See also 
 List of apricot diseases
 List of peach and nectarine diseases

References

External links 
 Index Fungorum
 USDA ARS Fungal Database

Fungal plant pathogens and diseases
Stone fruit tree diseases
Hymenochaetales